Palestine Post is the company responsible for postal service in the State of Palestine.

See also
 Postage stamps and postal history of the Palestinian National Authority
 Postage stamps and postal history of Palestine

External links
 Palestine Post official website (Arabic only)
 Universal Postal Union
 Palestine Postcode Listing

References

Communications in the State of Palestine
Postal organizations